Anthony "Tony" Bond (23 December 1913 – 6 July 1991) was an English professional footballer who played as a right-winger. He appeared in the Football League for Torquay United, Southport and Accrington Stanley.

1913 births
1991 deaths
Footballers from Preston, Lancashire
English footballers
Preston North End F.C. players
Blackburn Rovers F.C. players
Chorley F.C. players
Wolverhampton Wanderers F.C. players
Torquay United F.C. players
Leyland Motors F.C. players
Southport F.C. players
Accrington Stanley F.C. (1891) players
Fleetwood Town F.C. players
Bacup Borough F.C. players
Bamber Bridge F.C. players
English Football League players
Association football wingers